Eidos Interactive was a British video game publisher and developer, which was absorbed into Square Enix Europe in November 2009.

Video games

References

External links 
 Eidos games

Eidos Interactive